The 2015 All-Ireland Minor Football Championship is the GAA's premier inter-county Gaelic football competition for under 18's. 31 teams take part.

The defending champions were Kerry who defeated Donegal in the 2014 final.

Kerry retained their title with a comprehensive 4-14 to 0-06 win over Munster rivals Tipperary.

Teams
A total of 31 teams will contest the championship. Kilkenny, New York and London do not participate in the competition.

Format
Connacht, Leinster, Munster and Ulster organise four provincial championships on a knock-out basis. The four provincial winners  play the four provincial runners-up in the All-Ireland Quarter Finals.

Fixtures and results

Connacht Minor Football Championship

Leinster Minor Football Championship

LOSERS ROUND - The five losers from the preliminary round play-off and two teams advance to the Leinster Quarter Final

Munster Minor Football Championship

Playoff Round

Clare were the winners of a playoff round between the quarter final losers*

Ulster Minor Football Championship

All-Ireland Knockout

Quarter-finals

The four provincial champions play the four beaten finalists from the provincial championships.

Semi-finals

There is no draw for the semi-finals as the fixtures are pre-determined on a three yearly rotation. This rotation ensures that a provinces's champions play the champions of all the other provinces once every three years in the semi-finals if they each win their quarter-finals. If a provincial winner loses their quarter final, then the provincial runner-up who beat them takes their place in the semi-final.

Final

See also
 2015 All-Ireland Senior Football Championship
 2015 All-Ireland Under-21 Football Championship

References

All-Ireland Minor Football Championship